Walter Lee Harris (born August 10, 1974) is a former American football cornerback who played in the National Football League (NFL) for thirteen seasons. He played college football for Mississippi State University and was drafted by the Chicago Bears in the first round (13th overall) in the 1996 NFL Draft. He played for the Bears for six years and was then signed as a free agent by the Indianapolis Colts in 2002. He then signed with Washington Redskins in 2004. He signed with the San Francisco 49ers in 2006 where he earned his 1st trip to the Pro Bowl.

Harris signed with the 49ers in 2006, where he led the team with a career-high eight interceptions.

He was awarded NFC Defensive Player of the Month in November 2006.  Harris was also selected to represent the National Football Conference (NFC) in the 2007 Pro Bowl, in place of injured Philadelphia Eagles cornerback Lito Sheppard.

Harris blocked an extra point in a 17-16 LaGrange High School victory against Colquitt County in the 1991 AAAA state championship game, a win that led LaGrange High School to be named national champion by USA Today.

College career
Harris emerged as starter at Mississippi State University as a freshman at cornerback/free safety and played in ten games, including starts in the final three games.  As a sophomore, he earned All-SEC (second-team) honors and started every game.  That season, he tied the school seasonal record with six interceptions.  Harris was an Associated Press and Coaches First-team All-SEC while starting every game at cornerback as junior.  That season, he was ranked third in SEC and fifth in nation with six interceptions, led the team with 12 passes defensed, and recovered two fumbles and blocked two kicks.  As a senior, he had four interceptions and eight passes defensed, played in the Senior Bowl, and was selected First-team All-SEC.  Harris earned All-SEC honors in the final three seasons at Mississippi State.  As a four-year letterman, he shares the Mississippi State career interception record with Johnthan Banks at 16.

In 2018, Harris and Art Davis were enshrined into Mississippi State football's "Ring of Honor" adding their names to the facade of Davis Wade Stadium. They joined former Bulldog greats Jack Cristil, Jackie Parker, Shorty McWilliams, D.D. Lewis, Kent Hull, Johnie Cooks, and Joe Fortunato.

Professional career

Chicago Bears
Harris was selected by the Chicago Bears in the first round (13th overall) in the 1996 NFL Draft.  In his rookie season, Harris made 13 starts and recorded a career-high 113 tackles along with two interceptions and two forced fumbles.  The following season, he started in all 16 games for the first time in his career and finished the season with 95 tackles and five interceptions.  By the time the 1998 season started, Harris was a firmly established member of the team and a consistent starter.  From the 1998 season until the end of the 2000 season, he started every game.  The 1998 season finished with 85 tackles and four interceptions.  In 1999, his fourth for the Bears, Harris made 71 tackles and one interception.  The 2000 season saw Harris make 58 tackles and two interceptions.  In 2001, his last for the Chicago Bears, Harris made 50 tackles and one interception.

Indianapolis Colts
Harris was signed by the Indianapolis Colts on March 18, 2002 as an unrestricted free agent.  In his first season with the Colts he started 15 games and made 43 tackles and two interceptions.  In his final year for the Colts, Harris made 55 tackles.

Washington Redskins
Harris was signed by the Washington Redskins as a free agent on March 18, 2004.  In his first season with the Redskins, he played in 16 games recording 21 tackles and two interceptions.  In 2005, his final year for the Redskins Harris finished the season with 57 tackles and one interception.

San Francisco 49ers
Harris was signed by the San Francisco 49ers as a free agent on March 15, 2006.  In his debut season with the 49ers, he made 60 tackles, one sack, a career-high eight interceptions, and a 42-yard interception for a touchdown. That earned him his first trip to the Pro Bowl.

In the 2008 season, he recorded 49 tackles, one sack, and three interceptions (as of December 7, 2008). Harris missed the entire 2009 football season after tearing his ACL in 49er organized team activities (OTAs).

NFL statistics

Personal life
Harris attended LaGrange High School and was All-America honorable mention by USA Today. His team compiled a 34-6 record in his final three years. He also was a track hurdler.  He teamed with Thomas Smith to organize ticket donation program called "Corner to Corner" in first season with the Bears that provides tickets for each home game to the Boys and Girls Clubs of Chicago. The program included an on-field visit before each game and visits by Harris and Smith to clubs throughout the season. He partnered with fellow members of Bears secondary and Meals on Wheels in 2000 to "Intercept Hunger" with meal donations being made based on participating players’ performances each game. Harris and his wife, Trina, have four children: Courtney, London, Summer and Brandon.

References

External links

1974 births
Living people
People from LaGrange, Georgia
American football cornerbacks
National Conference Pro Bowl players
Mississippi State Bulldogs football players
Chicago Bears players
Indianapolis Colts players
Washington Redskins players
San Francisco 49ers players
Baltimore Ravens players